Earl Hazwell "Junior" Wooten (January 16, 1924 – August 12, 2006) was a professional baseball player. He played part of 1947 and all of 1948 in Major League Baseball for the Washington Senators, primarily as an outfielder.

External links

Major League Baseball outfielders
Washington Senators (1901–1960) players
Chattanooga Lookouts players
Kansas City Blues (baseball) players
Atlanta Crackers players
Milwaukee Brewers (minor league) players
Greenville Spinners players
Baseball players from South Carolina
1924 births
2006 deaths
People from Pelzer, South Carolina